Organpipe Nunatak is a nunatak rising to 150 m in the glacier flowing west into Holluschickie Bay, in northwest James Ross Island. Named descriptively following British Antarctic Survey (BAS) geological work on the island, 1985–86, from the excellent columnar jointing exhibited on the feature.

Nunataks of Graham Land
Landforms of James Ross Island